The Woodlawn International Invitational was a men's professional golf tournament held at Woodlawn Golf Course on the Ramstein Air Base, near Ramstein-Miesenbach in West Germany between 1958 and 1968. It was usually held the week following the German Open and, until its final year, had one of the highest prize funds in Continental Europe sponsored by the United States Air Force.

Winners

References

Golf tournaments in Germany
Recurring sporting events established in 1958
Recurring sporting events disestablished in 1968